The 2014 Georgia Tech Yellow Jackets football team represented the Georgia Institute of Technology in the 2014 NCAA Division I FBS football season. The Yellow Jackets were led by seventh-year head coach Paul Johnson and played their home games at Bobby Dodd Stadium. They were a member of the Coastal Division of the Atlantic Coast Conference.

After going 7–6 in 2013, the Yellow Jackets entered 2014 unranked. Georgia Tech won its first five games of the season, which included comeback victories over Georgia Southern and Virginia Tech, and end a five-game losing streak to Miami (FL). After losing back-to-back games to Duke and North Carolina, the Yellow Jackets won out the rest of its regular season, which was capped off with a 30–24 overtime victory over Georgia. The Yellow Jackets represented the Coastal Division in the ACC Championship Game, where they were defeated by Atlantic Division champions Florida State 37-35, however the Yellow Jackets were invited to the Orange Bowl, where they defeated Mississippi State 49–34. Georgia Tech ended the season with an 11–3 record and a #8 ranking in the final AP Poll.

Before the season

Previous season
The Yellow Jackets were members of the Coastal Division of the Atlantic Coast Conference, finishing the season 7–5 (5–3 in ACC play).  They were invited to the Music City Bowl where they were defeated by Ole Miss. Three players from the 2013 team were taken in the 2014 NFL Draft.

Preseason
Head coach Paul Johnson returned for his seventh year at the helm of the program. Vad Lee, who was Georgia Tech's starter in 2013, was replaced by Justin Thomas after Lee transferred to James Madison. The Yellow Jackets were picked to finish fifth in the Coastal Division in the ACC preseason media poll.

Recruiting class

Spring game
Georgia Tech's spring game was held on April 14 at Bobby Dodd Stadium. In a rain-soaked game, the White team, led by quarterback Tim Byerly, defeated the Gold team 20–12.

Coaching staff

Schedule

Schedule source:

Game summaries

Wofford

Near the end of the first half, Wofford took a 9–7 lead on a 92-yard touchdown run from Ray Smith. However, the Yellow Jackets were able to take a 10–9 lead into halftime with a 30-yard field goal from Harrison Butker. The Yellow Jackets expanded their lead in the third quarter 24–12 thanks to two touchdowns to wide receiver DeAndre Smelter. The Terriers closed gap 24–19 in the middle of the fourth quarter thanks to a 4-yard touchdown run from Octavius Harden, but the Yellow Jackets were able to score two more touchdowns towards the end of the game to win the matchup 38–19. In his first start as Georgia Tech's quarterback, Justin Thomas had 353 total yards of offense, including 282 passing yards.

Tulane

In the first game at Yulman Stadium, Georgia Tech defeated Tulane, 38–21. Tulane took a 14–7 lead going into the second quarter. Georgia Tech tied the game, 14–14, on a 10-yard interception return from linebacker Quayshawn Nealy. Tulane took a 21–14 lead with 9:38 left in the half on a 61-yard touchdown pass from Tanner Lee to Xavier Rush. An interception of Tanner Lee helped set up a 19-yard touchdown run from Tony Zenon to tie the game, 21–21. A 46-yard field goal from Harrison Butker gave Georgia Tech a 24–21 lead at halftime. Tulane was shut out in the second half, as Georgia Tech scored two more touchdowns to give the Yellow Jackets a 38–21 victory.

Georgia Southern

Georgia Tech dominated the first half, going into half with a 35–10 lead. However, Georgia Southern scored 28 unanswered points to give the Eagles a 38–35 lead in the middle of the fourth quarter. Recovering a Georgia Southern fumble with 4:12 remaining in the game, Georgia Tech were able to take a 42–38 lead with 23 seconds remaining on a 13-yard touchdown pass from Justin Thomas to Deon Hill to avoid a huge upset.

Virginia Tech

Virginia Tech led 13–3 in the middle of the second quarter. However, Georgia Tech was able to make it a 13–10 game on a 2-yard touchdown run from Justin Thomas. Georgia Tech took a 17–16 lead in the fourth quarter on a 41-yard interception return by Paul Davis. The Hokies then took a 24–17 when quarterback Michael Brewer recovered a fumble and ran 21 yards for a touchdown. Georgia Tech tied the game 24–24 on a nine-play, 67-yard drive that included a 4th-and-15 conversion and a 31-yard touchdown pass to DeAndre Smelter. Michael Brewer was intercepted on the ensuing Hokies drive. Taking advantage of the interception, Georgia Tech won the game 27–24 on a 24-yard field goal from Harrison Butker as time expired. The game not only marked Georgia Tech's first victory over Virginia Tech since 2009, but also at Blacksburg since 2006.

Miami

The Hurricanes scored first on a 21-yard touchdown pass from Brad Kaaya to Braxton Berrios. Georgia Tech tied the game 7–7 on a 1-yard touchdown run from Justin Thomas. At the end of the first quarter, Miami took a 14–7 lead on a 24-yard touchdown run from Duke Johnson. The Yellow Jackets would control the rest of the game, as Georgia Tech outscored Miami 21–3 to give the Yellow Jackets a 28–17 victory. The game marked Georgia Tech's first victory over Miami since 2008.

Duke

Georgia Tech entered the game ranked in the AP Poll for the first time since week 13 of the 2011 season. Duke took a 31–12 lead in the middle of the fourth quarter on a 1-yard touchdown run from Thomas Sirk. Georgia Tech was able to close the gap 31–25 thanks to two Tim Byerly rushing touchdowns. However, Georgia Tech was unable to recover their onside kick with 1:27 remaining in the game, giving the Blue Devils the victory. Georgia Tech turned the ball over three times and quarterback Justin Thomas was benched in favor of Tim Byerly the fourth quarter after Thomas threw his second interception. The game not only marked Georgia Tech's first loss to Duke since 2003, but also at home since 1994.

North Carolina

Georgia Tech trailed 42–31 in the fourth quarter after a 36-yard touchdown pass from Marquise Williams to Mack Hollins. The Yellow Jackets then scored two unanswered touchdowns, the latter being a 75-yard touchdown run off a reverse from wide receiver DeAndre Smelter, to give Georgia Tech a 43–42 lead with 3:07 remaining in the game. However, North Carolina scored on a 2-yard touchdown run from T. J. Logan with 11 seconds remaining to give the Tar Heels a 48–43 victory. The game marked Georgia Tech's first loss to UNC since 2008.

Pittsburgh

Taking advantage of four Pittsburgh turnovers, Georgia Tech took a 28–0 lead early in the game. Pittsburgh closed the gap 28–14 in the second quarter with two rushing touchdown from James Conner. After trading touchdowns the third quarter, Georgia Tech pulled away from the Panthers with three more rushing touchdowns to give Georgia Tech a 56–28 victory.

Virginia

At Georgia Tech's Homecoming game, the Yellow Jackets defeated the Cavaliers 35–10. Quarterback Justin Thomas threw three touchdowns and running back Synjyn Days ran for 147 yards while the Georgia Tech defense held Virginia to only 22 rushing yards.

North Carolina State

Georgia Tech trailed 13–7 near the end of the first quarter, but the Yellow Jackets outscored the Wolfpack 49–10 the rest of the game to win 56–23. Georgia Tech's offense rushed for 479 yards while the defense scored two defensive touchdowns.

Clemson

Georgia Tech took a 6–3 lead in the first quarter on an 85-yard interception return from Jamal Golden. In the third quarter, Chris Milton returned an interception 62 yards for a touchdown to give Georgia Tech a 25–6 lead. Georgia Tech won the game 28–6. Georgia Tech's defense limited Clemson's offense to only 190 yards.

In the following bye week, Georgia Tech clinched the ACC Coastal Division title when North Carolina defeated Duke 45–20.

Georgia

Georgia took a 7–0 lead early in the first quarter on a 1-yard touchdown run from Nick Chubb. Towards the end of the first quarter, Georgia drove deep into Georgia Tech's territory, hoping to expand their lead. However, Nick Chubb lost a fumble at Georgia Tech's 1-yard line.

Taking advantage of Chubb's fumble, Georgia Tech drove to Georgia's 20-yard line. However, Georgia Tech came up empty when Harrison Butker's kick was blocked. On the ensuing Georgia drive, UGA drove once again drove deep Georgia Tech territory. However, Georgia once again lost a fumble at Georgia Tech's 1-yard line, this time a fumble by Sony Michel. Taking advantage of the fumble, Georgia Tech was able to tie the game 7–7 near the end of the second quarter on a 7-yard touchdown pass from Justin Thomas to Darren Waller. In the third quarter, Georgia took a 14–7 lead after UGA's Damian Swann returned a Justin Thomas fumble 99-yards for a touchdown. After blocking a Georgia field goal, Georgia Tech tied the game 14–14 on a 4-yard touchdown run from Zach Laskey.

Early in the fourth quarter, Georgia took a 17–14 lead on a 19-yard field goal from Marshall Morgan. Georgia Tech responded with an 8-yard touchdown run from Zach Laskey to give the Yellow Jackets a 21–17 lead. Georgia Tech was then able to recover their own kickoff at Georgia's 27-yard line. However, Justin Thomas fumbled with 2:41 remaining in the game. Taking advantage of the fumble, UGA took a 24–21 lead with 18 seconds remaining on a 3-yard passing touchdown from Hutson Mason to Malcolm Mitchell. A squib kickoff gave Georgia Tech good field possession. After Justin Thomas scrambled 21 yards, Harrison Butker kicked a 53-yard field goal to tie the game 24–24 and send the game into overtime.

Georgia Tech received the ball first in overtime and took a 30–24 lead on a 2-yard touchdown run from Zach Laskey. However, the extra point was blocked and the game remained 30–24. On the ensuing UGA possession, Georgia was able to drive to Georgia Tech's 9-yard line, needing a touchdown and extra point to win. However, on a 2nd and goal play, Georgia Tech cornerback D.J. White intercepted a Hutson Mason pass intended for Malcolm Mitchell, sealing a victory for Georgia Tech. The game was Georgia Tech's first win over Georgia since 2008.

Florida State (ACC Championship Game)

In the ACC Championship Game, Georgia Tech took on Florida State, the defending national champions. Georgia Tech's offense scored on their first three possessions to give Georgia Tech a 21–14 lead in the middle of the second quarter. However, FSU scored two unanswered touchdowns to give FSU a 28–21 lead into halftime.

Georgia Tech was able to tie the game 28–28 on the opening drive in the third quarter. However, Florida State scored three field goals from Roberto Aguayo as the Seminoles were able to limit Georgia Tech's offense and pull ahead 37–28. Georgia Tech was able to cut Florida States' lead to two on a 25-yard touchdown pass from Justin Thomas to Darren Waller to make it a 37–35 game with 1:47 remaining. However, Georgia Tech was unable to recover their onside kick and Florida State was able to run out the clock, giving FSU the ACC Championship.

Mississippi State (Orange Bowl)

Appearing in their seventh Orange Bowl, Georgia Tech defeated Mississippi State 49–34. The Yellow Jackets went up 14–0 before Mississippi State scored 13 straight points to make it a 14–13 game. Georgia Tech was able to extend their lead 21–13 on a 13-yard touchdown run from Justin Thomas. On the final play of the first half, Mississippi State's Dak Prescott completed a 42-yard Hail Mary pass to make it a 21–20 lead going into halftime. On the second play of the second half, Georgia Tech went up 28–20 on a 69-yard touchdown run from Synjyn Days. Two more rushing touchdowns from Justin Thomas helped expand Georgia Tech's lead 42–20. In the first play of the fourth quarter, Mississippi State cut into Georgia Tech's lead on a 7-yard touchdown pass from Dak Prescott to De'Runnya Wilson to make it a 42–27 game. Georgia Tech was able to respond with a 4-yard touchdown run from Synjyn Days to give Georgia Tech a 49–27 lead. The Bulldogs were able to cut into Georgia Tech's lead with a 12-yard touchdown pass from Dak Prescott to De'Runnya Wilson with 2:20 remaining in the game to make it a 49–34 game. However, the Bulldogs were unable to recover their onside kick, and Georgia Tech was able to seal the win after running out the clock.

Georgia Tech rushed for 452 yards and Justin Thomas, the game's MVP, accounted for four total touchdowns. The game also marked Georgia Tech's first Orange Bowl victory in 63 years.

Rankings

Awards

Conference awards
ACC Coach of the Year
Paul Johnson

Honors

All-ACC
Eight players were honored as All-ACC selections by coaches
Second team
:DeAndre Smelter
:Shaq Mason
Justin Thomas
Adam Gotsis
Zach Laskey

Third team
Quayshawn Nealy
Jamal Golden

Honorable mention
Synjyn Days

NFL Draft
The following Georgia Tech players were selected in the 2015 NFL Draft:

References

Georgia Tech
Georgia Tech Yellow Jackets football seasons
Orange Bowl champion seasons
Georgia Tech Yellow Jackets football